Alliance for the Republic may refer to:

 Alliance for the Republic (Nicaragua)
 Alliance for the Republic (Senegal)
 Alliance for the Republic (Spain)